Vitaliano "Vic" Mauro (born 24 March 1987) is a former Italy international rugby league footballer who played for the Manly Warringah Sea Eagles in the National Rugby League and the Salford City Reds in the Super League.

Background
Mauro was born in Sydney, New South Wales, Australia.

Of Italian heritage, Mauro attended St. Paul's Catholic College and played junior football for the North Curl Curl Knights club in the Manly junior region.

Playing career
He made his first grade début for Manly-Warringah against the New Zealand Warriors at Mount Smart Stadium in 2007, and played 47 first grade games for the Manly club.

In 2011 he was announced as a member of the Italian side that competed in the 2013 World Cup qualifying. He made his début in a 52–6 win against Serbia.

On 2 October, Mauro was part of the Manly team that defeated the New Zealand Warriors in the 2011 NRL Grand Final.

Mauro signed with Salford City Reds after being released from Manly on 1 February 2013. He was released by the club on 24 July 2013, after playing in nine games.

References

External links
Manly Sea Eagles profile
NRL profile

1987 births
Living people
Australian rugby league players
Australian people of Italian descent
Italy national rugby league team players
Manly Warringah Sea Eagles players
Rugby league second-rows
Rugby league locks
Rugby league players from Sydney
Salford Red Devils players
Sunshine Coast Sea Eagles players